Lee Earl Emerson (December 19, 1898 – May 21, 1976) was an American politician who served in both the Vermont House of Representatives and the Vermont Senate. A member of the Republican Party, he was the 63rd Lieutenant Governor of Vermont and the 69th governor of Vermont. When he was first elected in the 1950 Vermont gubernatorial election, he received over 70% of the vote, something no Republican since has equaled. Despite his success in 1950, he lost the Republican primary for U.S. Senate in Vermont in 1958 to Congressman Winston L. Prouty. He also lost the 1960 primary for Vermont's seat in the U.S. House of Representatives to incumbent Governor Robert T. Stafford.

Early life
Emerson was born in Hardwick, Vermont on December 19, 1898, and moved to Barton at the age of 16. He graduated from Barton Academy in 1917, and served in the United States Army during World War I as a member of the Students' Army Training Corps. Emerson received an A.B. from Syracuse University in 1921 and an LL.B. from George Washington University Law School in 1926. He practiced law in Barton.

Political career
He was elected as a Republican to the Vermont House of Representatives in 1938 and served two terms. He was elected Speaker of the House in his second term, serving from 1941 to 1943.  He was elected to the Vermont Senate in 1942, served from 1943 to 1945, and was elected President Pro Tempore.  He was elected Lieutenant Governor of Vermont in 1944 and 1946, serving from 1945 to 1949.

Throughout much of Vermont's history Governors and Lieutenant Governors had served two one-year terms, and later one two-year term as part of the Republican Party's "Mountain Rule."  However, Ernest W. Gibson, Jr. had successfully challenged the established structure to win the governorship in 1946.  Gibson defeated Emerson in the 1948 Republican primary and went on to win reelection to a second term.  Emerson's fellow conservative Harold J. Arthur succeeded Emerson as Lieutenant Governor.  When Arthur unexpectedly became governor in 1950 after Gibson resigned to accept a federal judgeship, Arthur served out Gibson's term but declined to run for a full term himself, clearing the way for Emerson's comeback.  Emerson was elected Governor in 1950 and reelected in 1952, serving from 1951 to 1955.  (Arthur instead ran for the U.S. House and lost the Republican primary to Winston Prouty, who went on to win the general election.)

As Governor, he recommended that Vermont citizens serving in the Korean War be paid a bonus by the state. He supported studies of the feasibility of building a natural gas pipeline for Vermont and of possible racial discrimination in the state. Also during his administration, legislation known as the Forest Act was passed, providing assistance for municipalities to establish forests.

Emerson also played a role in "The Novikoff Affair," in which a tenured University of Vermont professor Alex B. Novikoff was dismissed for alleged Communist sympathies that were never substantiated.

Post gubernatorial career
In 1958, he ran unsuccessfully for the United States Senate, losing the Republican nomination to Winston Prouty.

In 1960, Emerson was an unsuccessful candidate for the Republican nomination for Vermont's seat in the United States House of Representatives, losing to incumbent Governor Robert T. Stafford.  Stafford went on to victory in the general election, defeating one term incumbent William H. Meyer, the first Democrat elected statewide in more than 100 years. (Myer had defeated Harold Arthur in the 1958 general election for the U.S. House seat.)

Personal
Emerson married Dorcas M. Ball on August 4, 1927. They had two children, Nancy and Cynthia.

Death and burial
He died in Berlin, Vermont, on May 26, 1976. He is buried at Welcome O. Brown Cemetery in Barton.

Footnotes

External links
 The Political Graveyard

1898 births
1976 deaths
People from Barton, Vermont
United States Army personnel of World War I
Syracuse University alumni
George Washington University Law School alumni
Vermont lawyers
Speakers of the Vermont House of Representatives
Republican Party members of the Vermont House of Representatives
Republican Party Vermont state senators
Presidents pro tempore of the Vermont Senate
Lieutenant Governors of Vermont
Republican Party governors of Vermont
Burials in Vermont
20th-century American politicians
People from Hardwick, Vermont